Árpád Milinte (born 4 May 1976 in Marcali) is a Hungarian football (goalkeeper) player who currently plays for Pálhalma SE.

References 
HLSZ 
Nemzeti Sport 
MLSZ 

1976 births
Living people
People from Marcali
Hungarian footballers
Association football goalkeepers
Kaposvári Rákóczi FC players
Fehérvár FC players
FC Sopron players
C.F. União players
Zalaegerszegi TE players
BFC Siófok players
Dunaújváros PASE players
Nemzeti Bajnokság I players
Hungarian expatriate footballers
Expatriate footballers in Portugal
Hungarian expatriate sportspeople in Portugal
Sportspeople from Somogy County